Dialium is a genus of flowering plants in the family Fabaceae, subfamily Dialioideae. Velvet tamarind is a common name for several species.

Species
, The Plant List accepts the following species:

Dialium angolense Oliv.
Dialium aubrevillei Pellegr.
Dialium bipindense Harms
Dialium cochinchinense Pierre
Dialium corbisieri Staner
Dialium densiflorum Harms
Dialium dinklagei Harms
Dialium englerianum Henriq.
Dialium eurysepalum Harms
Dialium excelsum Steyaert
Dialium gossweileri Baker f.
Dialium graciliflorum Harms
Dialium guianense (Aubl.) Sandwith
Dialium guineense Willd.
Dialium hexasepalum Harms
Dialium holtzii Harms
Dialium hydnocarpoides de Wit
Dialium indum L.
 var. bursa (de Wit) Rojo
 var. indum L.
Dialium kasaiense Steyaert
Dialium kunstleri Prain
Dialium latifolium Harms
Dialium madagascariense Baill.
Dialium occidentale (Capuron) Du Puy & R.Rabev.
Dialium orientale Baker f.
Dialium ovoideum Thwaites
Dialium pachyphyllum Harms
Dialium patens Baker
Dialium pentandrum Steyaert
Dialium platysepalum Baker
Dialium pobeguinii Pellegr.
Dialium poggei Harms
Dialium polyanthum Harms
Dialium procerum (Steenis) Steyaert
Dialium quinquepetalum Pellegr.
Dialium reygaertii De Wild.
Dialium schlechteri Harms
Dialium soyauxii Harms
Dialium tessmannii Harms
Dialium travancoricum Bourd.
Dialium unifoliolatum Capuron
Dialium zenkeri Harms

References

External links
 
 
 

 
Fabaceae genera
Taxonomy articles created by Polbot